The Men's Open International de Squash de Nantes 2018 is the men's edition of the 2018 Open International de Squash de Nantes, which is a tournament of the PSA World Tour event Challenger Tour 30 (Prize money: $28,000).

The event took place at the Théâtre Graslin in Nantes in France from 4 to 9 of September.

Declan James won his first Open International de Nantes trophy, beating James Willstrop in the final.

Prize money and ranking points
For 2018, the prize purse was $28,000. The prize money and points breakdown is as follows:

Seeds

Draw and results

See also
Women's Open International de Squash de Nantes 2018
Open International de Squash de Nantes
2018 PSA World Tour

References

External links
PSA Open International de Squash de Nantes 2018 Tournament
Open International de Squash de Nantes official website

2018 in French sport
2018 in squash
Open international de squash de Nantes